Diga is an album by the Diga Rhythm Band, a percussion-based music ensemble led by Grateful Dead drummer Mickey Hart and by Zakir Hussain.  It was released by Round Records as a vinyl LP in 1976.  It was remixed and released on CD by Rykodisc Records in 1988.

The ensemble, originally called the Tal Vadya Rhythm Band, was founded in 1973 by Zakir Hussain, at the Ali Akbar College of Music.  Mickey Hart joined in 1975, and Hussain and Hart renamed the group the Diga Rhythm Band.  Diga was recorded in 1976 at Hart's studio The Barn in Novato, California.

Jerry Garcia plays guitar on two of the album's five tracks.  The song "Happiness Is Drumming" is an early, instrumental version of "Fire on the Mountain".

Critical reception

On Allmusic, Jeff Tamarkin called Diga "a compelling and powerful recording that draws in the listener with its spellbinding rhythms."

Writing in The Music Box in 2008, John Metzger said that the album "effectively introduced percussion-driven, globally minded grooves to an entirely new audience. It also was far ahead of its time... Diga is, in hindsight, a very uneven affair...  If viewed from the perspective that it was the beginning rather than the end of a journey, it's much easier to see Digas charms."

Track listing
Original LP version

CD Version
When the album was released on CD, the tracks were re-ordered to: "Sweet Sixteen", "Magnificent Sevens", "Happiness Is Drumming", "Razooli", "Tal Mala".

Personnel
Diga Rhythm Band
Mickey Hart – traps, gongs, timbales, timpani
Zakir Hussain – tabla, folk drums, tar
Jordan Amarantha – congas, bongos
Peter Carmichael – tabla
Aushim Chaudhuri – tabla
Vince Delgado – dumbek, tabla, talking drum
Tor Dietrichson – tabla
Jim Loveless – marimbas
Joy Shulman – tabla
Ray Spiegel – vibes
Arshad Syed – duggi tarang, nal

Additional musicians
Jerry Garcia – guitar on "Happiness is Drumming", "Razooli"
Jim McPherson – vocals on "Razooli"
Kathy MacDonald – vocals on "Razooli"
David Freiberg – vocals on "Razooli"

Production
Mickey Hart – producer
Vince Delgado – associate producer
Zakir Hussain – production and arranging associate
Dan Healy – recording
Willy Wolf – recording
Betty Cantor – recording
Brett Cohen – assistant engineer
Jordan De La Sierra – cover art
Onehart – photograph
Steven Jurgensmeyer – package designCD remix:Tom Flye – engineer
Tom Size – assistant engineer
Joe Gastwirt – digital masteringDedication:'
"This album is dedicated to our friend and teacher Ustad Alla Rakha, and to all drummers everywhere".

References

Albums produced by Mickey Hart
Mickey Hart albums
1976 albums